Tiryakle (Tiräkle) is a rural locality (a village) in Sakmarsky Selsoviet, Zianchurinsky District, Bashkortostan, Russia. The population was 75 as of 2010. There are 2 streets.

Geography 
Tiryakle is located 100 km southeast of Isyangulovo (the district's administrative centre) by road. Ryskulovo is the nearest rural locality.

References 

Rural localities in Zianchurinsky District